The Roadside is an EP by English singer Billy Idol, his first release on George Harrison's Dark Horse Records. The EP is Idol's first release of new material since 2014's album Kings & Queens of the Underground. It was produced by Butch Walker and released on September 17, 2021. The EP's songs all feature Idol's longtime collaborator, guitarist Steve Stevens. 

The lead single, "Bitter Taste", references Idol's 1990 motorcycle crash, which nearly cost him his leg. Idol told American Songwriter: "I've never really written a song reflecting back on the motorcycle accident because I couldn't wait for it to be 20 years later, and now it's 31 years. I don't know about everybody else but for me personally, you have to let things marinate, and you never know how long that gestation period is going to last. The motorcycle accident is something I had 30 years to marinate and think about that."

Reception
Upon release, The Roadside received positive reviews from critics. Louder Sound'''s Dom Lawson noted, "Judging by his Instagram feed, Billy Idol is the coolest grandad on the planet. Perhaps surprisingly, The Roadside EP is every bit as cool and continues to the unexpected good form that the Rebel Yell legend displayed on his last two studio records." William Degenaro of Pop Matters said, "The Roadside'' bodes well for his future... 'Bitter Taste' could very well prove to be one of Idol's definitive creations."

Track listing

Personnel
 Billy Idol – vocals
 Zelma Davis – background vocals
 Blair Sinta – drums
 Steve Stevens – guitar
 Butch Walker – bass, drums, guitar, keyboards, percussion, programming, background vocals

References

Billy Idol EPs
2021 EPs
Albums produced by Butch Walker
Dark Horse Records albums